Terry Tarpey III (born March 2, 1994) is a French-American professional basketball player for Le Mans Sarthe of the LNB Pro A. He played college basketball with the William & Mary Tribe.

Tarpey was born in Poissy, the son of professional basketball player Terry Tarpey Jr., and moved to Stamford, Connecticut at the age of 4. He was twice named the best defender in the Colonial Athletic Association. As a junior, Tarpey posted 11.8 points, 8.4 rebounds, 1.8 steals, and 1.3 blocks per game. Tarpey was the first William & Mary player to record a triple-double with 18 points, 11 rebounds and 10 assists against James Madison in 2015. As a senior, he averaged 10.4 points and 7.8 rebounds per game.

Tarpey was named to the 12-man French National A team in 2016. He played for Denain in his first pro season. In 2017-18, Tarpey played for Le Mans Sarthe, which won the Pro A title. He averaged 6.8 points, 4.8 rebounds, two assists and 1.3 steals per game.

External links
FIBA profile

References

1994 births
Living people
American expatriate basketball people in France
American men's basketball players
Basketball players from Connecticut
Denain Voltaire Basket players
French men's basketball players
French people of American descent
French people of Lithuanian descent
Le Mans Sarthe Basket players
People from Poissy
Small forwards
Sportspeople from Stamford, Connecticut
Sportspeople from Yvelines
William & Mary Tribe men's basketball players